Let's Talk About Love is the fifth English-language and fifteenth studio album by Canadian singer Celine Dion, released on 14 November 1997, by Columbia and Epic Records. The follow-up to the commercially successful Falling into You (1996), Let's Talk About Love showed a further progression of Dion's music. Throughout the project, she collaborated with Barbra Streisand, the Bee Gees, Luciano Pavarotti, Carole King, George Martin, Diana King, Brownstone, Corey Hart, and her previous producers: David Foster, Ric Wake, Walter Afanasieff, Humberto Gatica, and Jim Steinman. The album includes Dion's biggest hit, "My Heart Will Go On". Written by James Horner and Will Jennings and serving as the love theme for James Cameron's 1997 blockbuster film, Titanic, "My Heart Will Go On" topped the charts around the world and is considered to be Dion's signature song. 
 
Let's Talk About Love and its songs won many awards around the world. "My Heart Will Go On" won the Grammy Award for Record of the Year, Song of the Year, Best Female Pop Vocal Performance and Best Song Written Specifically for a Motion Picture or for Television. In addition, the album was nominated for Best Pop Vocal Album and "Tell Him" for Best Pop Collaboration with Vocals.

Let's Talk About Love became one of the best-selling albums in history, with sales of over 31 million copies worldwide. The album also topped the record charts around the world, including the United States, Canada, the United Kingdom, France, Australia and many more. It became one of the best-selling albums of 1997 and 1998 in various countries, and also one of the top-selling albums of the decade. It was certified Diamond, Multi-Platinum, Platinum and Gold around the world. Various singles were released, depending on the country. In addition to the major success of "My Heart Will Go On", other singles included "Tell Him", "Be the Man", "The Reason", "To Love You More", "Immortality", "Miles to Go (Before I Sleep)" and "Treat Her Like a Lady".

Conception and composition
The follow-up to her successful album Falling into You (1996), Let's Talk About Love was recorded in London, New York, and Los Angeles, and featured a host of special guests: Barbra Streisand on "Tell Him", Bee Gees on "Immortality", Italian operatic tenor Luciano Pavarotti on "I Hate You Then I Love You", and Jamaican reggae singer Diana King and American R&B group Brownstone on "Treat Her Like a Lady". "The Reason" was co-written by Carole King and produced by George Martin, who produced nearly all of The Beatles' recordings. The most successful single from the album became the classically influenced ballad "My Heart Will Go On", which was written by James Horner and Will Jennings. Serving as the love theme for the 1997 blockbuster film Titanic, "My Heart Will Go On" topped the charts around the world, and has become Dion's signature song.

Tracks on Let's Talk About Love were produced mainly by David Foster, Ric Wake, Walter Afanasieff, Humberto Gatica and Corey Hart. Let's Talk About Love includes cover songs such as Leo Sayer's "When I Need You" and Mina's "Grande grande grande" (recorded as an English-language duet titled "I Hate You Then I Love You"). Sony Music Entertainment issued few different editions of Let's Talk About Love around the world. Aside from the main thirteen tracks, "To Love You More" was included on the US and Latin America editions, "Be the Man" on the European, Australian and Asian editions, "Amar Haciendo el Amor" outside the US and "Where Is the Love" outside Latin America.

Critical reception

Let's Talk About Love divided music critics. Billboard editor Paul Verna gave it a positive review. He wrote that Dion's "super-charged vocals are expectedly potent and often reach for heavens" and praised the restrained Bee Gees' collaboration "Immortality", top forty border-breaking "To Love You More", Carole King/George Martin effort "The Reason", explosive "Us" and the Titanic single "My Heart Will Go On". He also noted that Dion spreads her wings on tracks like the reggae-splashed "Treat Her Like a Lady" featuring Diana King and Brownstone, and "I Hate You Then I Love You", a curious duet with Luciano Pavarotti. Larry Flick, also from Billboard, spoke positively about "Tell Him" and "My Heart Will Go On". He called "Tell Him" an event and wrote that two of pop music's best voices are united on a "grand, wonderfully over-the-top ballad that will melt the heart of even the most jaded listener". He also called it an electrifying "girlfriend" anthem. Flick wrote about "My Heart Will Go On" that this song woos with romantic lyrics and a melancholy melody that is fleshed out with a weeping flute solo. He noted that Dion hit notes that shatter glass but she also build slowly and has the ability to pack volumes of emotion in a whisper. Flick also wrote that "My Heart Will Go On" will add a much-needed touch of class to every station it graces.

Senior editor of AllMusic, Stephen Thomas Erlewine gave Let's Talk About Love four stars out of five. He noted that Falling into You established Dion as a superstar in America, so its sequel, Let's Talk About Love, was designed to consolidate her position as a newly minted star. The album was constructed as a blockbuster, featuring Dion's trademark melodramatic ballads, some carefully tailored dance-pop, a bevy of duets with the likes of Barbra Streisand and the Bee Gees, and production and songs from adult contemporary gurus David Foster, Jim Steinman, and Walter Afanasieff. According to Erlewine, given that so many talented craftsmen worked on Let's Talk About Love, it makes sense that a number of the cuts succeed according to adult contemporary terms—they are predictably sweeping showcases for Dion's soaring, technically skilled voice. As usual, the singles (including the Streisand duet "Tell Him" and the Titanic love theme "My Heart Will Go On") shine the most brilliantly, but even the filler is immaculately produced. Erlewine ended his review saying that if the end result doesn't quite gel as an album, that shouldn't be surprising—this is music by committee, a product that was made to appeal to the widest possible audience. Such a calculated execution guarantees that anyone who liked one of the singles shouldn't be disappointed by Let's Talk About Love, but it doesn't necessarily mean they will remember all of the record after it has finished playing.

David Browne from Entertainment Weekly gave the album a grade of C. He wrote that aiming for the widest possible audience, Let's Talk About Love is top-heavy with renowned duet partners (Barbra Streisand, the Bee Gees, Luciano Pavarotti), proven middle-of-the-road producers (Walter Afanasieff, David Foster, Jim Steinman), and an obligatory remake (a precisely enunciated version of Leo Sayer's "When I Need You"). According to him, most of the album is composed of the heavy-hearted ballads that have made Dion a star, but for added crossover appeal, it also includes a beat-by-numbers dance track ("Just a Little Bit of Love") and an overarranged stab at reggae dancehall (the unintentionally amusing "Treat Her Like a Lady"). And to cement the music-film bond, it even features a movie theme (for the similarly epic Titanic). Browne noted that just as recent big-budget summer movies have piled on special effects at the expense of plausible story lines, Let's Talk About Love forgets that a pop album, no matter the budget, needs solid songs. He felt that most of the songs here, from the Gibb brothers' banal "Immortality" (written for the forthcoming London stage production of Saturday Night Fever) to the air balloon "My Heart Will Go On" (love theme from Titanic), are flimsy concoctions that droop under the weight of their arrangements. He added that Streisand glides like butter into the duet Tell Him — making Dion sound like margarine in the process — but the song is an Uberschlock ode to subservience. Browne finished the review saying that Dion gives it her all, sounding hurt or empowered as each number demands, but her voice has so little personality that it too is lost amid the ornateness. Elysa Gardner of the Los Angeles Times gave the album two out of four stars saying that Dion's voice is a technical marvel, but her delivery lacks the personality and intuitive sense of drama that are a diva's stock in trade. A negative review came from Jonathan Bernstein of The New York Observer. He panned the album with the exception of "When I Need You", "Just a Little Bit of Love" and "My Heart Will Go On".

Impact and legacy 
Et Canada listed four Dion's albums including Let's Talk About Love in their list of top ten Canadian music albums of all time.

Commercial performance
Before it was even released, Sony announced they had orders for 10 million copies globally. By the end of 1998, Let's Talk About Love has sold 27 million copies worldwide (8.1 million in the US & 1.7 million in Canada), becoming 1998's best-selling album domestically and internationally. To date, Let's Talk About Love has sold over 31 million copies worldwide and became one of the best-selling albums in history.

United States
In the United States, it debuted at number two with 334,000 copies sold. The sales kept increasing until a 624,000 total in its sixth week, though remaining at number two. Finally, Let's Talk About Love topped the Billboard 200 chart the following week in January 1998. Until May 1998, the album stayed a total of seventeen weeks at number two, despite reaching number one only once. It became the best-selling studio album of the year in the US (second overall), selling 7.9 million copies in the country. It was certified Diamond by the RIAA in November 1999, for shipments of over ten million copies in the US. As of February 2013, Let's Talk About Love has sold 9,601,000 copies in the United States according to Nielsen SoundScan, with an additional 1,110,000 units sold at BMG Music Club. SoundScan does not count albums sold through clubs like the BMG Music Service, which were significantly popular in the 1990s.

Canada
In Canada, after only 3 weeks, it was certified Diamond, selling one million copies in that span. It also debuted at number one with 230,212 copies sold, setting a record for the largest opening sales week in Canadian history, until being surpassed by the 306,000 copies sold by Adele's 25 (2015). Let's Talk About Love has sold 1.7 million copies in Canada. It topped the Canadian and Quebec charts for two weeks.

UK, France and Germany
In the United Kingdom, Let's Talk About Love entered the chart at number one and spent five non-consecutive weeks at the top. In October 1998, it was certified six-times Platinum by the BPI, and eventually the album has sold two million copies there. In France, Let's Talk About Love spent seven weeks at number one and was certified Diamond in April 1998, selling 1,610,000 units. Let's Talk About Love became Dion's first chart-topping album in Germany, where it spent five weeks at number one. In 1999, it was certified three-times Platinum by the BVMI for sales of 1.5 million copies.

Other markets
The album has also sold over one million units in Japan and was certified Million by the RIAJ. In Australia, it debuted at number one and spent five non-consecutive weeks at the top. It was certified seven-times Platinum by the ARIA. Let's Talk About Love topped the charts around the world and was certified Diamond, Multi-Platinum, Platinum and Gold in many countries. It has sold over ten million copies in Europe (ten-times IFPI Platinum Europe Award) and over two million units in Latin America.

Singles
The first single from Let's Talk About Love, "Tell Him" (duet with Barbra Streisand) premiered on the radio in the United States on 7 October 1997. It was not released commercially in the US and therefore it could not enter the Billboard Hot 100. However, the physical single was released on 31 October 1997 in Germany and on 3 November 1997 in the rest of Europe and Australia, and became a hit. The song reached number one in the Netherlands and reached top ten in Ireland, Belgium, United Kingdom, France, Italy, Spain, Switzerland, Norway and Australia. It was certified Platinum in the Netherlands and Belgium, and Gold in the UK, France, Australia, Switzerland and Norway. In Japan, "Be the Man" was issued as the first single on 13 November 1997. It reached number twenty-four on the Oricon chart and was certified Platinum by the RIAJ. Between 5 and 8 December 1997, "The Reason" was released as the second single in few European countries. It peaked just outside top ten in the UK and Ireland, and also charted in Belgium.

"My Heart Will Go On" (love theme from Titanic) premiered on the radio in the United States on 25 November 1997. As a commercial single, it was issued there on 10 February 1998. The song debuted at number-one on the Billboard Hot 100, where it stayed for two weeks. It was certified Gold and has sold 1,791,000 copies in the US as of April 2012. The physical single was first released in Germany on 5 December 1997, and later the same month in Australia. In most countries it was issued in January 1998. In France, it was released as a Double A-side single with "The Reason". In the UK, "My Heart Will Go On" was released on 9 February 1998. The song went to number one for many weeks all over the world and became Dion's biggest hit, and one of the best-selling singles of all time, and was the world's best-selling single of 1998. It is considered Dion's signature song and one of the biggest love ballads of the 1990s. Certified Diamond, Multi-Platinum, Platinum and Gold around the world, "My Heart Will Go On" has sold two million copies in Germany, 1.5 million in the UK and 1.2 million in France.

"To Love You More" was released as the third but promotional only single in the US on 5 May 1998. Although it could not enter the Billboard Hot 100, "To Love You More" topped the Adult Contemporary chart and reached number eleven on the Hot 100 Airplay. "Immortality" (with the Bee Gees) was released as the next single in Europe, Australia and Canada in June 1998. At first it was issued on 5 June 1998 in Germany and three days later in France. In the UK, it was released on 6 July 1998. The song reached top ten in Germany, Austria, the UK and Switzerland. It was certified Platinum in Germany, Gold in Sweden and Silver in the UK and France. In late September 1998, "Miles to Go (Before I Sleep)" entered the Adult Contemporary chart in Canada and peaked at number seventeen there. "Treat Her Like a Lady" (featuring Diana King and Brownstone) was released as the last single from Let's Talk About Love in selected European countries. It was issued on 19 March 1999 in Germany and 28 June 1999 in the UK. "Treat Her Like a Lady" reached top forty in Austria, the UK and Ireland.

Promotion
In the United States, Dion started promotion of her new album with the performance of "Let's Talk About Love" on Good Morning America in November 1997. The same month she sang "Immortality" with the Bee Gees at their One Night Only concert in Las Vegas. In December 1997, Dion performed "My Heart Will Go On" on The Rosie O'Donnell Show, The Tonight Show with Jay Leno and during the Music for UNICEF Concert in New York. On 14 December 1997, she also attended to the premiere of Titanic in Hollywood. In January 1998, Dion sang "My Heart Will Go On" and "Let's Talk About Love" on The Today Show and in February 1998, she performed "My Heart Will Go On" on The Oprah Winfrey Show. Dion also performed "My Heart Will Go On" at the 40th Annual Grammy Awards on 25 February 1998 and at the 70th Academy Awards on 23 March 1998. In April 1998, she sang "Treat Her Like a Lady" with Diana King and Brownstone at the Essence Awards in New York. Later the same month, she performed "My Heart Will Go On", "The Reason" (in duet with Carole King) and several other songs during the VH1 Divas concert in New York. Other performers included Aretha Franklin, Mariah Carey, Gloria Estefan and Shania Twain. In May 1998, Dion appeared on The Rosie O'Donnell Show again and sang "To Love You More", her next US single.

Dion also promoted Let's Talk About Love in other countries. In November 1997, she performed "Let's Talk About Love", "When I Need You" and "Treat Her Like a Lady" during the Canadian television special, Parlons d'amour. The same month, she also performed "The Reason" on Dutch television show, Kanjer Surprise. In December 1997, Dion sang "The Reason" on The Lottery Show, and "The Reason" and "My Heart Will Go On" at the Smash Hits Poll Winners Party in the United Kingdom. The same month, she also performed "The Reason" on Fantastico in Italy and Les Années Tubes in France. In January 1998, Dion performed "My Heart Will Go On" on Des O'Connor Tonight in the UK. The next month, she also sang it on Top of the Pops in the UK, Wetten, dass..? in Germany and during the Sanremo Music Festival in Italy. In the latter, she also performed "The Reason". In April 1998, Dion appeared on the French television special titled La Soirée Spéciale: Céline Dion where she performed "My Heart Will Go On", "Let's Talk About Love", "Treat Her Like a Lady" with Diana King and "The Reason". In June 1998, she appeared on another French television show, Hit Machine and sang "The Reason", "Treat Her Like a Lady" with Diana King, "Immortality" with the Bee Gees and "My Heart Will Go On". The same month she performed "My Heart Will Go On" and "Immortality" with the Bee Gees on the German television show, Geld Oder Liebe. On 9 June 1998, Dion performed "I Hate You Then I Love You" in duet with Luciano Pavarotti and "My Heart Will Go On" at the Pavarotti & Friends charity concert in Italy. In July 1998, she sang "Immortality" with the Bee Gees on Top of the Pops in the UK.

On 21 August 1998, Dion embarked on the Let's Talk About Love World Tour in Boston. She toured North America till the end of 1998, Asia in early 1999 and North America again in March and April 1999. She also visited Europe in June and July 1999, and North America again at the end of 1999. Many concerts in Europe in May and June 1999 were cancelled when Dion's husband René Angélil was diagnosed with skin cancer. In August and September 1999, Au cœur du stade album and Au cœur du stade DVD were released in Europe and Canada. They included the Francophone setlist of the tour.

Industry awards

At the 41st Annual Grammy Awards, "My Heart Will Go On" won Grammy Award for Record of the Year, Best Female Pop Vocal Performance, Song of the Year and Best Song Written Specifically for a Motion Picture or Television, and Let's Talk About Love was nominated for Best Pop Album. One year earlier, "Tell Him" was nominated for the Grammy Award for Best Pop Collaboration with Vocals. At the American Music Awards of 1999, Dion won American Music Award for Favorite Pop/Rock Female Artist and Favorite Adult Contemporary Artist, Let's Talk About Love was nominated for Favorite Pop/Rock Album and Titanic: Music from the Motion Picture won in category Favorite Soundtrack. In 1998, Dion won six Billboard Music Awards, including Top Billboard 200 Album Artist, Top Billboard 200 Album Artist - Female, Hot Adult Contemporary Artist, Hot Soundtrack Single ("My Heart Will Go On"), and Titanic: Music from the Motion Picture won in categories Top Billboard 200 Album and Hot Soundtrack Album. Dion was also nominated for the Billboard Music Awards for Top Pop Artist - Female, Hot Adult Contemporary Singles & Tracks ("My Heart Will Go On") and Top Billboard 200 Album (Let's Talk About Love). At the Juno Awards of 1999, Dion took home four trophies in categories: Best Female Vocalist, Best Album (Let's Talk About Love), Best Selling Album (Foreign or Domestic) (Let's Talk About Love) and International Achievement Award. And the Juno nominees included: Best Single ("My Heart Will Go On"), Best Pop Album (Let's Talk About Love), Best Selling Album (Foreign or Domestic) (Titanic: Music from the Motion Picture) and Producer of the Year (Corey Hart for "Miles to Go (Before I Sleep)" and "Where Is the Love"). Dion also won World Music Award for World's Best Selling Canadian Artist of the Year in 1998 and World's Best Selling Female Pop Artist of the Year in 1999. At the 25th People's Choice Awards, Dion won in category Favorite Female Musical Performer and in 1998, she won three VH1 Awards for Artist of the Year, Best Female Artist and Diva of the Year. "My Heart Will Go On" also won Academy Award for Best Original Song and Golden Globe Award for Best Original Song.

Other awards won by Dion included: Amigo Award for Best International Female Artist, ASCAP Film and Television Music Award for Most Performed Song from Motion Picture ("My Heart Will Go On"), ASCAP Pop Awards for Most Performed Songs ("My Heart Will Go On" twice and "To Love You More"), Blockbuster Entertainment Award for Favourite Song from a Movie ("My Heart Will Go On") (Titanic: Music from the Motion Picture was nominated for Favorite Soundtrack), BMI Film & TV Award for Most Performed Song from a Film, BMI Pop Awards for Most Performed Songs ("My Heart Will Go On" and "To Love You More" twice), Gold Otto for Female Singer at the Bravo Otto Awards, Echo Award for International Female Artist of the Year in 1999 (nominated in the same category in 1998), Félix Award for Artist of the Year Achieving the Most Success in a Language Other Than French in 1999 (nominated in the same category in 1998), Gémeaux Award for Best Variety Special (Let's Talk About Love avec Céline Dion) (also nominated in other categories for Let's Talk About Love avec Céline Dion and Let's talk from Las Vegas, Céline television specials), Hungarian Music Award for International Album of the Year (Let's Talk About Love), Japan Gold Disc Award for International Artist of the Year and International Pop Album of the Year (Let's Talk About Love), Japan Record Award in category Special Achievement Award ("My Heart Will Go On"), Las Vegas Film Critics Society Award for Best Song ("My Heart Will Go On"), Malta Music Award for Best Selling Female International Artist, MuchMusic Video Award for Peoples Choice: Favourite Artist ("My Heart Will Go On"), NARM Best Seller Award for 1997-1998 Soundtrack (Titanic: Music from the Motion Picture), Performance Magazine Award for Best Pop Act, Pop Corn Music Award for Best Female Singer of the Year, Satellite Awards for Best Original Song ("My Heart Will Go On") and Best Original Score (Titanic: Music from the Motion Picture) and South African Music Award for Best Selling International Album (Let's Talk About Love).

Dion was also nominated for Brit Award for Best International Female in 1998 and accepted the award for Best Soundtrack (Titanic: Music from the Motion Picture) on behalf of James Horner in 1999. She was also nominated for MTV Europe Music Award for Best Female, MTV Video Music Award for Best Video from a Film ("My Heart Will Go On") and MTV Video Music Award – Viewer's Choice ("My Heart Will Go On"). Other nominations include: Danish Music Awards for Best International Female Singer and Best International Hit ("My Heart Will Go On"), Edison Awards for Best International Female Singer and Single of the Year ("Tell Him"), and Fryderyk Award for Best Foreign Album (Let's Talk About Love). Her television special Celine Dion - Let's Talk About Love was also nominated for Gemini Award in category Best Photography in a Comedy, Variety, Performing Arts Program or Series.

Track listing
The album contains 13 songs featured on every edition and few bonus tracks, depending on the country: "Where Is the Love" and "To Love You More" in the US, "Amar Haciendo el Amor" and "Where Is the Love" in Canada, "Amar Haciendo el Amor", "Where Is the Love" and "Be the Man" in Europe, Asia and Australia, and "To Love You More" and "Amar Haciendo el Amor" in Latin America.

Notes
  signifies an assistant producer
  signifies an additional vocal producer
  signifies an additional producer
  signifies a co-producer
  signifies additional production and remix

Personnel 

Adapted from AllMusic.

 Christina Abaroa – coordination
 Walter Afanasieff – arranger, composer, drum programming, keyboard programming, multi instruments, rhythm programming
 Kenny Aronoff – drums
 Michael Baird – drums
 Jeff Balding – engineer
 David Barratt – production coordination
 Trevor Barry – bass
 Bee Gees – group, guest artist, background vocals
 Michael Bigwood – track engineer
 Kenny O. Bobien – background vocals
 George Bodnar – photography
 Doug Boehm – assistant vocal engineer
 Juan Bohorquez – assistant vocal engineer
 Jeff Bova – keyboards
 Stuart Brawley – assistant vocal engineer, mixing assistant, programming
 Chris Brooke – assistant vocal engineer, engineer, mixing assistant
 Alex Brown – background vocals
 Brownstone – group, guest artist, vocals
 Bob Cadway – vocal engineer
 Dana Calitri – background vocals
 Rachelle Cappelly – background vocals
 Emile Charlap – background vocals
 Maria Christensen – background vocals
 Vinnie Colaiuta – drums
 Richard Cottle – Fender Rhodes
 Rupert Coulson – engineer
 Paulinho Da Costa – percussion
 Lynn Davis – background vocals
 Céline Dion – primary artist, vocals, background vocals
 John Doelp – executive producer
 Nathan East – bass
 Felipe Elgueta – engineer, programming, synthesizer
 Leslie Ellis – background vocals
 Paul J. Falcone – assistant vocal engineer
 Manuel de Falla – composer
 Keith Fluitt – background vocals
 Sherree Ford-Payne – background vocals
 David Foster – arranger, composer, keyboards, producer
 Simon Franglen – synclavier programming
 Mark Fraunfelder – assistant vocal engineer
 Humberto Gatica – mixing, producer, vocal engineer, vocals
 Barry Gibb – composer
 Maurice Gibb – composer
 Robin Gibb – composer
 Jim Gilstrap – backing vocals
 David Gleeson – engineer
 Jean-Jacques Goldman – composer
 Tony Gonzalez – assistant vocal engineer
 Mark Hagen – assistant engineer
 Taro Hakase – violin
 Troy Halderson – assistant vocal engineer
 Albert Hammond – composer
 Brian Harding – assistant vocal engineer
 Corey Hart – composer, guest artist, keyboards, producer
 Andrea Corr – tin whistle
 Tawatha Agee – background vocals
 Lillias White – background vocals
 LaChanze – background vocals
 Roz Ryan – background vocals
 Cheryl Freeman – background vocals
 Vanéese Y. Thomas – background vocals
 Ross Hogarth – assistant engineer
 James Horner – composer
 Jean-Marie Horvat – mixing, vocal engineer
 Mark Hudson –  composer
 Dann Huff – guitar
 Phillip Ingram – background vocals
 Arthur Jacobson – composer
 Will Jennings – composer
 Skyler Jett – background vocals
 Bashiri Johnson – percussion
 Dennis Johnson – drums
 Richie Jones – arranger, drums, programming
 Eliot Kennedy – composer
 Carole King – composer, guest artist, piano
 Curtis King, Jr. – background vocals 
 Diana King – composer, guest artist, vocals
 Kryzler & Kompany – arranger, guitar
 Eric Kupper – keyboards
 Michael Landau – guitar, acoustic guitar, electric guitar
 Tyson Leeper – assistant vocal Engineer
 Vito Luprano – executive producer
 Billy Mann – composer
 Glen Marchese – assistant vocal engineer
 George Martin – arranger, conductor, producer
 Giles Martin – assistant producer
 Andy Marvel – composer
 Robbie McIntosh – guitar
 Al McKay – guitar
 John Merchant – engineer
 Laura Mercier – make-up
 Junior Miles – composer
 Norman Newell – composer
 Serge Normant – hair stylist
 Konesha Owens – background vocals
 Billy Pace – composer, percussion programming, producer
 Rafael Padilla – percussion
 Pino Palladino – bass
 Dean Parks – guitar
 Luciano Pavarotti – guest artist, performer, primary artist
 Paul Picard – percussion
 John Pellowe – engineer
 Shawn Pelton – drums
 Leon Pendarvis – string arrangements
 John Pierce – bass
 Tim Pierce – guitar, acoustic guitar
 Steve Porcaro – guest artist, programming, synthesizer
 Sylvain Quesnel – guitar
 Dave Reitzas – engineer
 Tony Renis – arranger, composer, producer
 Denise Rich – composer
 Nicki Richards – background vocals
 Claytoven Richardson – background vocals
 Earl Robinson – background vocals
 Alejandro Rodriguez – engineer
 Arnie Roman – composer
 William Ross – arranger, composer, string arrangements
 Dimo Safari – photography
 Carole Bayer Sager – composer
 Tsuneyoshi Saito – synthesizer
 Dave Scheuer – assistant engineer, track engineer
 Al Schmitt – engineer
 Ethan Schofer – assistant vocal engineer
 Mark Schulman – guitar
 Danny Sembello – composer
 Tina Shafer – composer
 Marti Sharron – composer
 Dan Shea – drum programming, keyboards, programming, rhythm programming, sound design, synthesizer
 Dorian Sherwood – background vocals
 David Spinozza – guitar
 Ramón Stagnaro – acoustic guitar
 Jim Steinman – engineer, producer
 Eddie Stockley – background vocals
 Barbra Streisand – guest artist, performer, primary artist
 Aya Takemura – assistant vocal engineer
 Yoshinobu Takeshita – bass, programming
 Fabio Testa – composer
 Ian Thomas – drums
 Vaneese Thomas – background vocals
 Greg Thompson – assistant vocal engineer
 Michael Thompson – electric guitar, Photography
 Linda Thompson-Jenner – composer
 Jeanie Tracy – background vocals
 Eric Troyer –	background vocals
 Ric Wake – arranger, producer
 Greg Wells – composer
 Audrey Wheeler – background vocals
 Thomas R. Yezzi – track engineer
 Scott Young – assistant vocal engineer
 Joe Zee – stylist
 Peter Zizzo – arranger, composer, drum programming, guitar, keyboards, background vocals

Charts

Weekly charts

Monthly charts

Year-end charts

Decade-end charts

All-time charts

Certifications and sales

Release history

Notes

See also

Best-selling albums in the United States since Nielsen SoundScan tracking began
Juno Award for Album of the Year
List of best-selling albums
List of best-selling albums by women
List of best-selling albums in Canada
List of best-selling albums in Europe
List of best-selling albums in France
List of best-selling albums in Germany
List of best-selling albums in Japan
List of best-selling albums in Taiwan
List of best-selling albums in the United States
List of Billboard 200 number-one albums of 1998
List of diamond-certified albums in Canada
List of European number-one hits of 1997
List of European number-one hits of 1998
List of fastest-selling albums
List of number-one albums from the 1990s (New Zealand)
List of number-one albums in Australia during the 1990s
List of number-one albums of 1997 (Canada)
List of number-one singles of 1998 (France)
List of Top 25 albums for 1997 in Australia
List of Top 25 albums for 1998 in Australia
List of UK Albums Chart number ones of the 1990s

References

External links
 

1997 albums
550 Music albums
Albums produced by Walter Afanasieff
Albums produced by David Foster
Albums produced by Humberto Gatica
Albums produced by Jim Steinman
Albums produced by Ric Wake
Celine Dion albums
Columbia Records albums
Epic Records albums
Juno Award for Album of the Year albums
Juno Award for International Album of the Year albums